Tyoply Stan is a station near the southern end of the Moscow Metro's Kaluzhsko-Rizhskaya Line.

Design
It was built to column tri-span design and opened on 6 November 1987 and was a temporary terminus of the line. (Remains of a piston junction can still be seen near the station.) Because of the extreme radius where Kaluzhskiy turns by a nearly right angle, Tyoply Stan, unlike the previous seven stations of the line, is located at an angle to Profsoyuznaya Street. Both the walls and the transverse faces of the pillars are faced with brightly coloured red ceramic tile. Grey marble was employed for the longitudinal faces of the pillars. The architects of Tyoply Stan were N. Shumakov, G. Mun, and N. Shurygina.

The entrances to the station are located at the intersection of Profsoyuznaya Street and Novoyasenevsky Avenue.

Traffic
The station's daily traffic is 73,400 passengers.

Moscow Metro stations
Railway stations in Russia opened in 1987
Kaluzhsko-Rizhskaya Line
Railway stations located underground in Russia